Şorbaçı (also, Shorbachi and Shorbachy) is a village and municipality in the Jalilabad Rayon of Azerbaijan.  It has a population of 605.

References 

Populated places in Jalilabad District (Azerbaijan)